The Holy Archangels Michael and Gabriel Romanian Orthodox Church is a church in Malajnica, in the Timok Valley, Serbia, consecrated in 2004. It is the first Romanian church in eastern Serbia in 170 years, during which time Romanians in the Timok Valley had not been allowed to hear liturgy services in their native language. It is also a notable topic of Romania–Serbia relations, the church not being recognized by the Serbian authorities.

Bojan Aleksandrović initially tried to seek building permission, approaching Negotin council (to whose jurisdiction the village belongs) in November 2003. Aleksandrović built the church and adjoining rectory in 2004 on his private property and began using it for worship in the autumn of 2004. On 4 December 2004, Bishop Daniil (Stoenescu) – who heads the Romanian diocese in Serbia – dedicated the church bells. Ministry of Foreign Affairs (Romania) noted on 10 January 2005 that its embassy in Belgrade had maintained constant contact with Bojan Aleksandrović since the previous month about the fate of his church in Malajnica. But on 20 January 2005, Negotin council issued Bojan Aleksandrović with an order to demolish the church, the belfry and the parish house within 15 days. On 21 January 2005 – the day after the demolition order was issued – the Romanian Ministry of Foreign Affairs expressed "deep regret" over the way the local authorities had behaved, especially as planning permission is not required in the village.

The president of Romania Traian Băsescu attended a religious service in the church on November 2, 2011.

References

External links
 SERBIA: Romanian Orthodox church threatened with demolition 
 Romanian priest to pay for official destruction of his church
 Hramul Bisericii din Mălainiţa/ Sărbătoare românească în Valea Timocului la Biserica părintelui Boian Alexandrovici 
 President of Romania, Traian Basescu in Negotin, Malajnica, with Romanians from the Timok 
 Vizita a lui Basescu la Malajnica Serbia Negotin 2 noiembrie 2011 
 SERBIA: Police ban Romanian Orthodox commemoration
 Biserica românească din Malainița amenințată din nou
 România Liberă, Biserica Mălăinița, singurul lăcaș de cult unde se aude vorba românească
 Articol din ianuarie 2005 despre conflictul din Malainița
 Dumnezeu nu ştie româneşte în Valea Timocului

Romanian Orthodox churches in Serbia
Romanians in Serbia
Malajnica
Churches completed in 2004